Operation Tiger Claw (October 17–19, 1967) was a military conflict between Nigerian and Biafran military forces. The battle took place in the major port of Calabar. The Nigerian were led by  Benjamin Adekunle while the Biafrans were led by Maj. Ogbo Oji. The aftermath was a major loss to the Biafrans because it cost the Biafrans one of their largest ports.

Background

Prior to the invasion of Calabar the Nigerian Army had been successful in forcing the invading Biafran Army to retreat from the Midwest Region in late September 1967 while also managing to capture the Biafran capital, Enugu, on October 4. The Nigerian 3rd Marine Division under the command of Colonel Benjamin Adekunle disembarked from Warri aboard numerous warships bound for the port of Bonny, which was captured on October 7. The Nigerians now planned to use Bonny as a launchpad for invading Calabar.

Invasion

In October 1967 a Nigerian Navy armada on a naval campaign left the port of Bonny en route to Calabar. Inside the ships were the heavily armed troops of the Nigerian 3rd Marine Division under the command of Colonel Benjamin Adekunle. At the time Calabar was defended by the Biafran 9th Battalion under the command of Maj. Ogbo Oji, who was responsible for the defense of Biafra's entire southeast coastline from Opobo to the Cameroon border. On October 17 Biafran defenses on Calabar's beaches came under heavy aerial and naval bombardment. Less than 24 hours later the Nigerian 8th Battalion under the command of Maj. Ochefu disembarked from Lokoja and was able to capture Calabar's cement factory. Later that day the Nigerian 33rd Battalion landed on Calabar's beach, among them Col Adekunle himself. The small but stubborn Biafran resistance was overwhelmed but managed to retain control over certain parts of Calabar and its surrounding area. Bloody hand-to-hand fighting ensued after Nigerian troops began to enter Calabar from 3 different positions. Maj. Oji was seriously wounded during the fighting and evacuated to Umuahia while his outnumbered troops retreated to new defensive positions on the outskirts of Calabar. Lt. Col. David Okafor replaced Oji and decided that he would not counterattack until he was re-enforced by the Biafran 7th Battalion under the command of Lt. Col. Adigio. The 7th Battalion at first refused to embark to Calabar because their machine guns had been sent to Biafran troops fighting against Major Muhammadu Buhari and had been left with single-shot bolt-action rifles. After the 7th Battalion finally accepted the task Lt. Col. Adigio was replaced with Col. Festus Akagha. On October 19 the Biafran 7th Battalion arrived in Calabar where they were met by Nigerian armored cars, which they had no answer to. Col. Akagha relayed a message to President Odumegwu Ojukwu in which he stated the situation in Calabar was hopeless and that they were in desperate need of assistance. In the face of imminent devastation Ojukwu sent newly conscripted white mercenaries to Calabar but they came under immediate heavy Nigerian fire. After suffering unusually high casualties the remaining mercenaries retreated north and fled Biafra, never to return.

Aftermath

The day after the surrender all captured Biafran troops were forced to give up all of their weapons. After Operation Tiger Claw the two sides were met at a stalemate until the Capture of Port Harcourt. One day after the Capture of Port Harcourt Benjamin Adekunle with Col Murtala Mohammed invaded the Biafran cities of Owerri, Aba, and Umuahia which started Operation OAU. Col. Adekunle claimed that he could capture all three cities in two weeks but in reality it took six months and the Nigerians were unable to capture the Biafran capital of Umuahia. The Biafrans then took back the city of Owerri in January 1969. There were only minor scuffles until Nigerians captured Umuahia on December 24, 1969. The war finally ended on January 15, 1970, after the ending of Operation Tail-Wind.

References

Nigerian Civil War
Tiger Claw
1967 in Nigeria
Tiger Claw